The 2010 season is Pohang Steelers' 28th season in the K-League in South Korea. Pohang Steelers competed in K-League, League Cup, Korean FA Cup, AFC Champions League.

Squad

On loan

K-League

Korean FA Cup

League Cup

Group stage

AFC Champions League

Group stage

Knockout stage

Statistics

Appearances and goals
Statistics accurate as of match played 7 November 2010

Top scorers

Discipline

Transfers

In

Loan In

Out

Loan Out

References

Pohang Steelers
Pohang Steelers
2010